Leonel Marshall may refer to:

Leonel Marshall Sr. (born 1954), Cuban volleyball player during 1970s and 80s; won bronze in 1976 Summer Olympics
Leonel Marshall Jr. (born 1979), Cuban volleyball player, son of above; competed in 2000 Olympics; defected from Cuba

See also
Marshall (surname)